Stelian is a masculine Romanian given name. Notable people with the name include: 

Stelian Badea, Romanian footballer
Stelian Burcea
Stelian Isac, Romanian footballer
Stelian Moculescu
Stelian Popescu
Stelian Stancu
Stelian Tănase

Romanian masculine given names